Pediomelum hypogaeum (also known as Psoralea hypogaea) is a perennial herb also known as the little Indian breadroot or subterranean Indian breadroot. It is found on the black soil prairies in Texas.

Growth
It has an inflorescence on stems 5-6 centimeters long, separate from the leaves, arising from a subterranean stem and deep carrot-shaped root that is 3–7 cm long. The long petioled leaves are palmately divided into 5 linear-elliptic leaflets that are 3-5 centimeters long. The flowers, borne in condensed spikes separate from the leaves, are purple and pea-like, and have a surprisingly strong scent, reminiscent of lemon furniture polish.  The species has edible tuberous roots, high in protein.

References
 Delena Tull (1987), Edible and Useful Plants of Texas and the Southwest, pgs 86-87

External links
United States Department of Agriculture Natural Resources Conservation Service.  PLANTS Profile: Pediomelum hypogaeum...subterranean Indian breadroot
Texas A&M Bioinformatics Working Group. Texas Endemics: Distribution of Pediomelum hypogaeum var. scaposum

Psoraleeae
Herbs
Root vegetables